The St. Louis WCT was a men's tennis tournament played in St. Louis, Missouri from 1970 to 1978.  The event was part of the WCT Tour and was held on indoor carpet courts except from 1974 to 1975, when it was held on outdoor clay courts.

Finals

Singles

Doubles

References
 ATP World Tour archive
 ITF Vault
 ITF Vault
 ITF Vault

World Championship Tennis
Defunct tennis tournaments in the United States